Dennis Windross (12 May 1938 – 9 October 1989) was an English footballer who scored 11 goals from 98 appearances in the Football League playing as a forward or wing half for Middlesbrough, Brighton & Hove Albion, Darlington and Doncaster Rovers. He was a scorer in Doncaster's record League win, by ten goals to nil against his former club Darlington on 25 January 1964.

References

External links
Biography

1938 births
1989 deaths
People from Guisborough
English footballers
Association football wing halves
Middlesbrough F.C. players
Brighton & Hove Albion F.C. players
Darlington F.C. players
Doncaster Rovers F.C. players
English Football League players
Place of death missing